The Frankenfield Covered Bridge is a wooden covered bridge that spans Tinicum Creek in Point Pleasant, Pennsylvania, United States. Hollow Horn Road branches off from Cafferty Road a short distance from the south end of the span and goes south.

It was built in 1872, and is a town truss bridge constructed of oak.

It was added to the National Register of Historic Places on December 1, 1980.

Gallery

References

Covered bridges in Bucks County, Pennsylvania
Covered bridges on the National Register of Historic Places in Pennsylvania
Bridges completed in 1832
Wooden bridges in Pennsylvania
Bridges in Bucks County, Pennsylvania
Tourist attractions in Bucks County, Pennsylvania
National Register of Historic Places in Bucks County, Pennsylvania
Road bridges on the National Register of Historic Places in Pennsylvania
Lattice truss bridges in the United States